Athlete Refugee Team competed at the 2022 World Athletics Championships in Eugene, United States, from 15 to 24 July 2022. It entered 3 athletes.

Entrants
Track and road events

References

2022
Nations at the 2022 World Athletics Championships